The Sanders Canyon Formation is a geologic formation exposed north and west of the Sierra Blanca of southern New Mexico. It preserves fossils dating back to the Eocene epoch.

Description
The formation consists of volcaniclastic mudstone (70%) and sandstone (30%), with less sandstone in the higher beds. The grayish-purpose color contrasts with the reddish color of the underlying Cub Mountain Formation and reflects a content of greater than 25% volcanic debris. The upper beds interfinger with the overlying Sierra Blanca Volcanics.

The formation is part of the only extensive exposures of Cretaceous and Paleogene rocks in a large area of south-central and southeastern New Mexico. It is interpreted as sediments deposited by north-northeast-flowing streams. It may correlate with the Palm Park Formation and Rubio Peak Formation, and the overlying Sierra Blanca Volcanics have a maximum age of 38 million years, suggesting the age of the Sanders Canyon Formation is between 43 million and 38 million years.

History of investigation
The formation was first defined by Steven M. Cather in 1991, from beds formerly assigned to the Cub Mountain Formation. The formation was named for Sanders Canyon, just north of the type section.

Footnotes

References
 
 

Paleogene formations of New Mexico